Minerva is a rural locality in the Central Highlands Region, Queensland, Australia.

Geography 
The Nogoa River forms the western boundary of the locality. The terrain is mountainous with many named peaks, including:

 Bimbenang Peak 
 Birdcage
 Crystal Hill 
 Funnel Mountain 
 Little St Peter 
 Mount Alexander 
 Mount Cullender 
 Mount Ebenezer 
 Mount Elizabeth 
 Mount Helmet 
 Mount Horatio 
 Mount Minerva 
 Mount Promenade 
 Mount Spencer 
 Mount Wallaroo 
 Mount Wandoo 
 Mount Wills 
 Red Hill 
 Spring Hill 
 St Peter 
 Summer Hill 
 Sunrise Hill

History 
Minerva Provisional School opened on 8 November 1904 with Miss Elsie Hyde the first teacher. By June 1905 there were 31 students enrolled. On 1 January 1909 it became Minerva State School. It closed on 31 December 1928.

On 17 April 2020, the Queensland Government re-drew the boundaries of localities within the Central Highlands Region by replacing the locality of The Gemfields with three new localities of Rubyvale, Sapphire Central and Anakie Siding (around the towns of Rubyvale, Sapphire, and Anakie respectively). As a consequence of these changes, the boundary between Lochington and Minerva/Gindie more closely follows the course of the Nogoa River.

References 

Central Highlands Region
Localities in Queensland